Mercœur may refer to the following places in France:

Mercœur, Corrèze, a commune in the department of Corrèze
Mercœur, Haute-Loire, a commune in the department of Haute-Loire

Or to the
Duke of Mercœur